Caridad Yuson Sanchez-Babao (born August 1, 1933 in Mandaue) is a Filipina actress, mostly seen on GMA Network. In 1977, she played the role of Nanay Idad in the revival TV drama series based from the very successful radio soap opera (first heard over DZRH in 1949) Gulong ng Palad as a household mother of Luisa.

Early life and career
Caridad Sanchez is her real and stage name. Both her father, Marcos F. Sanchez, and mother, Sofia Yuson, are from Mandaue, Cebu. She comes from a big family of 15 children, and she is the youngest. She dreamt to become a lawyer before she become an actress. 

As a professional actress she did Visayan films and then starred in many TV shows in supporting roles in the early 1960s to the 1970s. She honed her acting skills working with big stars such as Dolphy, Nida Blanca, and Fernando Poe Jr. She was later cast in bigger roles in the late 1970s. She became a TV household favorite as Nanay Edad in Gulong ng Palad, a classic radio serial turned TV soap on the old BBC 2. She then made acting comebacks in multiple sitcoms and weekly drama anthologies. She appeared as John Lloyd Cruz’s grandmother in Tabing Ilog, a show for younger viewers. In 2001 she starred in Sa Puso Ko Iingatan Ka as Judy Ann Santos’s grandmother and in 2003-2004 she played a major role as Joel Torre’s mother in Sana’y Wala Nang Wakas on ABS-CBN. In 2005-2015 she appeared on TV shows and movies with GMA Network. 

She is remembered for playing supporting roles in dramas and comedies. She is currently retired from acting.

Personal life

She was married to Vicente Babao and they two had children named Cathy Babao, who was a grief educator, counselor, and columnist at the Philippine Daily Inquirer and Alexander Joseph Babao. She was widowed at the age of 47 after Vicente died from heart attack and raised their children alone. Cathy described her parents are "both very passionate people with strong beliefs."

In 1998, she lost her four-year-old grandson, Migi, who died from heart surgery. 

Sanchez is the aunt of ABS-CBN broadcaster Julius Babao.

Health
In an Instagram post on September 17, 2020, Sanchez's daughter, Cathy Babao, disclosed the actress' battle with dementia which was diagnosed in late 2015. However, Alexander Joseph disputed his sister's claims, explaining that Sanchez only has a "mild cognitive handicap that goes with aging" and is physically fit under his care. He also called out his sister for violating their mother's privacy.

Filmography

Film

Television

References

External links
 

1936 births
Living people
Actresses from Cebu
Filipino television actresses
Filipino television personalities
People from Mandaue
People from Quezon City
Visayan people
GMA Network personalities
ABS-CBN personalities